The National Search and Rescue Plan or National SAR Plan is a policy document of the US government that establishes the responsibilities for search and rescue in the domestic United States, as well as areas where the US has international commitments.

The Plan makes the US Coast Guard responsible for maritime search and rescue, while inland SAR is the responsibility of the Air Force. Both have Rescue Coordination Centers  to coordinate this effort, and also cooperatively operate Joint Rescue Coordination Centers where appropriate. These centers receive Cospas-Sarsat distress alerts sent by the United States Mission Control Center in Suitland, Maryland and are responsible for coordinating the rescue response to the distress. Each service takes a slightly different approach to search and rescue operations.

Inland SAR 
The Air Force Rescue Coordination Center at Tyndall Air Force Base, Florida, coordinates all inland search and rescue activities in the continental U.S., but does not directly prosecute SAR cases. In most situations, the actual operation is carried out by the Civil Air Patrol, state police or local rescue services.

Maritime SAR 
The US Coast Guard coordinates and conducts maritime SAR missions. The Coast Guard uses the Search and Rescue Optimal Planning System to most accurately model leeway divergence for many search and rescue objects as well as optimize planned search areas.

Coast Guard RCCs are set up to cover specific geographic areas and react to command and coordination centers. The geographic areas of responsibility are divided among nine Coast Guard District commands and two Rescue Sub-Centers (RSC).

USCG RCCs

 District 1 - Boston, Massachusetts
 Atlantic Area/District 5 - Portsmouth, Virginia (RCC Norfolk)
 District 7 - Miami, Florida
 District 8 - New Orleans, Louisiana
 District 2 - Cleveland, Ohio
 Pacific Area/District 11- Alameda, California
 District 13- Seattle, Washington
 District 14- Honolulu, Hawaii
 District 17- Juneau, Alaska
 Puerto Rico RSC - San Juan, Puerto Rico
 Marianas RSC - Guam

Other 
The U.S. Department of Defense Southern Command Search and Rescue Center in Key West, Florida helps to coordinate Cospas-Sarsat activity in Central and South America.

References

External links
 NOAA Rescue Coordination Center Information Page

Federal government of the United States
United States Coast Guard
United States Air Force
Rescue